The 6th International Film Festival of India was held from 3–16 January 1977 in New Delhi. The festival highlighted Indian films which have won awards at foreign film festivals. The festival instituted Silver Peacock Awards for Best Director, Best Actor, Best Actress, Short film, along with Bronze Peacock for Best Short film for the first time. From the sixth edition the period as well as the dates for the festival were fixed as 3–17 January every alternate year. A film market was also set up for the first time by the "Indian Motion Picture Export Corporation" now National Film Development Corporation of India. The "Indian Panorama section" was instituted from this edition.

Winners
Golden Peacock (Best Film):  "Brother and Sister" by Tadashi Imai (Japanese film)
Golden Peacock (Best Short Film) "After the Silence" (Indian film)

References

1977 film festivals
06
1977 in Indian cinema